Free at Last is the sixth studio album by rapper Yukmouth, released on June 1, 2010 on Smoke-a-Lot Records/RBC.

Track listing

Charts

References

Yukmouth albums
2010 albums
Gangsta rap albums by American artists